Princess Suknyeong (Hangul: 숙녕옹주, Hanja: 淑寧翁主; 1649 — 1666 or 1668) was a Korean Joseon Dynasty Princess, and the only daughter of King Hyojong of Joseon and Royal Noble Consort An.

Biography

Early life 
The Princess was born as the only child and daughter in 1649, during her grandfather’s King Injo’s 27th year of reign, to then Grand Prince Bongrim and Lady Yi of the Gyeongju Yi clan. She is the younger half-sister of King Hyeonjong and the half-aunt to King Sukjong.

Marriage 
The 13 year old Princess married the 10 year old Park Pil-seong, son of Park Tae-jang, from the Bannam Park clan on 10 April 1662 lunar calendar; the 3rd year reign of Hyeonjong of Joseon. A year later on 4 August 1662, Park was given the title of Prince Consort Geumpyeong (금평위, 錦平尉). At the age of 17 or 18, Princess Suknyeong then gave birth to a daughter in 1667 and named her Park Hui-gyeong.

Death 
The Princess later died 4 or 6 years later leaving her husband to live around 80 years more than the Princess, and dying at the age 96 years old on 10 July 1747 lunar calendar; 23rd year reign of Yeongjo of Joseon. Her mother also outlived her by 27 or 29 years and died at the age of 72 in 1693. 

In 1666, the 7th year of reign of King Hyojong, “Princess Suknyeong is dead” ("숙녕 옹주가 죽었다.”) was recorded in the annals. But in 1668, the Princess was once again mentioned in the annals stating she died. It was speculated that the Princess died from the smallpox that had been affecting the palace grounds at that time. In the Joseon Annals, it states that there was an unclear statement on what exact date she died; which brought two different death dates but others say that 1668 is more acceptable since her daughter was born in 1667.

The Princess's tomb was firstly located in Sojeokseong-dong, Dong-myeon, Yangju-si, Gyeonggi-do and then moved to Songneung-ri, Jingeon-myeon, Namyangju-si, Gyeonggi-do.

Family
Father: Hyojong of Joseon (3 July 1619 - 23 June 1659) (조선 효종왕)
Grandfather: Injo of Joseon (7 December 1595 - 17 June 1649) (조선 인조왕)
Grandmother: Queen Inryeol of the Cheongju Han clan (16 August 1594 - 16 January 1636) (인렬왕후 한씨)
Mother: Royal Noble Consort An of the Gyeongju Yi clan (안빈 이씨) (September 1622 - October 1693) 
Grandfather: Yi Eung-heon (이응헌, 李應憲)
Husband: Park Pil-seong, Prince Consort Geumpyeong (1652 - 1747) (박필성 금평위)
Father-in-law: Park Tae-jang, Duke Dojeong (박태장 도정공)
 Issue
Daughter: Park Hui-gyeong, Lady Park of the Bannam Park clan (1667 - ?) (박희경, 朴喜慶)
 Son-in-law: Yi Su-cheol (이수철, 李秀喆)

References

1649 births
1666 deaths
Princesses of Joseon
17th-century Korean people
17th-century Korean women